Egor Nikolayevich Bulatkin (born June 25, 1994), better known by his stage name Egor Kreed and KReeD, is a Russian rapper, singer and songwriter. He began his career under his stage name "KReeD" in 2014, but later changed it to "Egor Kreed".

Early life
Egor Kreed was born on June 25, 1994 in Penza. His father, Nikolai Bulatkin, works at a company that produces nuts while his older sister, Polina, lives and works in the United States as a singer and actress. To pursue his career, he moved to Moscow.

He wanted to become a singer since the age of 11 when he heard 50 Cent's song "Candy Shop". After high school, he enrolled at the Academy of Music Gnesinon Kreed.
He posted his first song titled "Lyubov v seti" on YouTube in July 2011. The video brought success and recognition from across Russia, racking up millions of views.

In March 2012, Kreed won the "Star Vkontakte – Channel Five" in the category "Best Hip Hop Project". He was the chosen from among 1000 other competitors. He earned more than twenty thousand votes and was invited to perform at Saint Petersburg's BKZ "October's", where he performed "Vdokhnovenie" (Inspiration).

He gained millions more YouTube views from the release of a cover version of "Ne skhodi s uma" (Don't Be Mad), which Timati originally performed. In April 2012, Kreed signed with Timati's label "Black Star Inc". His debut track was "Starletka" (Starlet) recorded in the spring of 2012. The music video included popular Russian actress and model, Miroslava Karpovich, from the Russian TV series Daddy's Daughters (Papiny Dochki). He appeared at major Moscow venues, including "Olympic", "Luzhniki", "OCE", and "Poklonaya Gora". He also performed at events such as Hip-Hop Unite, May First, City Youth, ELLO Festival, and Euro 2012. In April 2015 Kreed released an album titled Holostyak (The Bachelor).

As of 2018, he had recorded about 60 songs, including "Nado li", "Zavedi moi puls", "Samaya Samaya", "Nevesta", "Rasstoyaniya", "Starletka", "Tolko ty" and "You're my galaxy".

On October 9, 2014, Kreed released his biggest hit "Samaya Samaya", which moved into a more pop genre. It reached number one on the Russian charts and earned over twenty million views on YouTube. In April 2015, he released the song "Nevesta", featuring Anastasia Mikhailyuta and directed by Aleksey Kupriyanov.

On June 21, 2018, Kreed and Timati held an unauthorized mass event in Moscow on Bolshaya Dmitrovka by staging an impromptu performance on the roof of a car, blocking traffic. This promoted the opening of the Timati's beauty salon. The next day, lawyer Alexander Khaminsky filed an application to initiate cases on this incident in the Department of the Ministry of Internal Affairs of Tver and the Moscow State Traffic Safety Inspectorate.

Over the course of his career, Kreed has recorded songs with Timati, Klava Koka, MOLLY, Morgenshtern, Philipp Kirkorov, and others.

Personal life
In 2015, he had a relationship with Moldovian-American model Xenia Deli, followed by a relationship with Russian singer Nyusha. He has been on TV show Холостяк (Kholostyak).

Discography
Studio albums
 Holostyak (2015)
 What do they know (2017)
 58 (2020)
 Pussy Boy (2021)

Video Clips

"Holostyak" Album 
 Track list:
 Samaya samaya
 Zapomni i zapishi
 Nado li
 Revnost'
 Ne my
 Tol'ko ty, tol'ko ya
 Ey naplevat'
 Nevesta
 Ne vynesti
 Tishina
 My prosto lyubili tak
 Beregu
 Papina dochka
 Holostyak
 Budilnik

References

External links
Black Star Inc. Official Site 
Egor KReeD lyrics 
Official channel on YouTube

1994 births
Living people
People from Penza
Russian rappers
Russian hip hop musicians
21st-century Russian singers
21st-century Russian male singers
Russian hip hop
Rappers from Saint Petersburg
Russian hip hop groups
Winners of the Golden Gramophone Award